Ludi may refer to:

 Ludo, board game called "Ludi" in the Caribbean
 Ludi (comics), in the Marvel Universe, a demon who has clashed with Doctor Strange.
Ludi, games presented as part of ancient Roman religious festivals, Latin plural of ludus

See also
 Lüdi
 Ludus (disambiguation)